Hoover was an American post-hardcore band from Washington, D.C. Formed in 1992, Hoover went on to produce some of the more intense music to appear on the Dischord Records label in the 1990s. Compared to Fugazi, Hoover was more experimental and permissive, incorporating elements of jazz and dub, and not limiting themselves to an aggressive stance. Unusually, three of the four members shared vocal duties equally.

Vulture.com listed their song "Electrolux" as one of the greatest emo songs of the early 1990s.

Hoover disbanded in 1994, but have reformed twice: once in 1997 to record a mini-album of 'odds and ends', and again in 2004 for a series of dates in the US and Europe.

Members
Alexander Dunham – guitar, vocals
Fred Erskine – bass, vocals, trumpet
Christopher Farrall – drums
Joseph P. McRedmond – guitar, vocals

Discography

Studio albums
The Lurid Traversal of Route 7 (1994, Dischord)
Hoover (1998, Slowdime)

Singles
"Sidecar Freddie/Cable" (1992, Hoover Union/Dischord)
"Two-Headed Coin" (split with Lincoln) (1993, Art Monk Construction)
"Private" (1993, Hoover Union/Dischord)

Compilations
All the President's Men (1994, Old Glory)
20 Years of Dischord (2002, Dischord)

Related bands
 Abilene - Alex Dunham, Frederick Erskine
 Admiral - Joseph McRedmond
 The Boom - Christopher Farrall, Frederick Erskine
 The Crownhate Ruin - Frederick Erskine, Joseph McRedmond
 Fine Day - Christopher Farrall
 Freddie T. & the People - Frederick Erskine
 HiM - Frederick Erskine
 Hoonah - Frederick Erskine
 June of 44 - Frederick Erskine
 Just a Fire - Frederick Erskine
 Radio Flyer - Alex Dunham
 Regulator Watts - Alex Dunham
 Sea Tiger - Christopher Farrall, Joseph McRedmond
 Sevens - Christopher Farrall
 The Sorts - Christopher Farrall
 Watts Systems Ltd. - Alex Dunham
 Wind of Change - Alex Dunham

References

External links
Hoover - BandToBand.com

American post-hardcore musical groups
Dischord Records artists
Punk rock groups from Washington, D.C.
Musical groups established in 1992
Musical groups disestablished in 1994
First-wave emo bands
American emo musical groups